Wuyishan Airport , formerly Chong'an Airport, is an airport serving Wuyishan City as well as Nanping, Fujian province, China.

Airlines and destinations

See also
List of airports in China
Wuyi New Area

References

Airports in Fujian
Nanping